Gerbstedt was a Verwaltungsgemeinschaft ("collective municipality") in the Mansfeld-Südharz district, in Saxony-Anhalt, Germany. The seat of the Verwaltungsgemeinschaft was in Gerbstedt. It was disbanded on 1 January 2010.

The Verwaltungsgemeinschaft Gerbstedt consisted of the following municipalities:

Former Verwaltungsgemeinschaften in Saxony-Anhalt